Albert Pynegar (24 September 1895 – 1978) was an English footballer who played at inside-forward for Eastwood Rangers, Sutton Town, Leicester City, Coventry City, Oldham Athletic, Port Vale, Chesterfield, and Rotherham United. He helped Port Vale to the Third Division North title in 1929–30, and then fired Chesterfield to the same honour the following season.

Career
Pynegar played for Eastwood Rangers, Sutton Town, Leicester City, Coventry City and Oldham Athletic, before joining Port Vale in January 1929, in a deal where he and £1,300 were exchanged for Stewart Littlewood. He had been the "Latics" top-scorer in the 1926–27 and 1927–28 seasons with 19 and 18 goals respectively. He scored a hat-trick in an 8–1 victory over West Bromwich Albion at The Old Recreation Ground on 9 March, and then four goals in a 5–0 win over Bristol City on 4 May. Despite these comprehensive victories, and his record of ten goals in 18 games, Vale were relegated out of the Second Division at the end of the 1928–29 season. In the 1929–30 season, Pynegar scored 22 goals in 33 games, whilst strike partner Sam Jennings claimed 27 goals, to help the club win the Third Division North title. The pair gelled well on the pitch despite not getting along off the pitch. This tally of Pynegar's included a hat-trick against New Brighton on 9 September. In the 1930–31 campaign he scored three goals in nine games, before he was dropped from the first team. He put in a transfer request which was granted when he was transferred to Chesterfield in October 1930; apparently there developed a rift between him and Jennings. Chesterfield paid Port Vale a fee of £200. He scored on his club debut on 1 November, in a 1–1 draw with Stockport County. The "Spireites" won the Third Division North title in 1930–31, finished 17th in 1931–32, and were then relegated out of the Second Division in 1932–33. He then moved to Rotherham United in a player-exchange for Jimmy McCormick, and scored three goals in 17 Third Division North games in the 1933–34 season.

Career statistics
Source:

Honours
Port Vale
Football League Third Division North: 1929–30

Chesterfield
Football League Third Division North: 1930–31

References

People from Basford, Nottinghamshire
Footballers from Nottinghamshire
English footballers
Association football forwards
Eastwood Rangers F.C. players
Sutton Town A.F.C. players
Leicester City F.C. players
Coventry City F.C. players
Oldham Athletic A.F.C. players
Port Vale F.C. players
Chesterfield F.C. players
Rotherham United F.C. players
English Football League players
1895 births
1978 deaths